Juan Severino Mallari was a Filipino Catholic priest. He is the first documented serial killer from the Philippines. During the Spanish colonial period, Mallari served as a parish priest in Magalang, Pampanga. He reportedly killed 57 people in the area. In 1840, he was hanged for his crimes.

Timeline

Before 1809 
Mallari was from San Nicolas , Pampanga, south of Magalang. He studied theology at the University of Santo Tomas.

1809 
Fr. Mallari completed his studies at the University and was ordained, after which he became the coadjutor in Gapan, Lubao, and Bacolor. He then vied for the position of parish priest in several areas, namely Orani, Mariveles, and Lubao but was consistently rejected.

1816-1826 
Fr. Mallari became the parish priest in Magalang, Pampanga for 10 years. It was during this period that he started believing his mother was cursed (or kinulam), which became his motive for killing. He believed killing people could cure his mother's ailments. It is also plausible that around this time, Fr. Mallari's peers noticed signs of the priest's mental instability.

He contracted an unknown illness sometime in 1826
, which led to an attending priest, who had to look after Fr. Mallari, finding the personal belongings of his victims in his home. Fr. Mallari was imprisoned for 14 years. However, Dr. Luciano Santiago argued the priest should have been sent to the first mental health institution in the Philippines instead. Dr. Santiago might have been referring to either Hospicio de San Jose or San Lazaro Hospital.

During this period, Fr. Mallari also pursued calligraphy, earning him the recognition of being the second Filipino calligraphic artist-priest, after Fr. Mariano Hipolito.

1840 
The Spanish colonial government executed Fr. Mallari by hanging. His execution took place 32 years prior to the GomBurZa execution, where three priests were killed for being falsely accused of treason and sedition.

References

Further reading 

 L. Santiago. Laying the Foundations: Kampampangan Pioneers in the Catholic Church, 1592-2001, Juan D. Nepomuceno Center for Kapampangan Studies, Holy Angel University, 2002. 

1840 deaths
19th-century Filipino Roman Catholic priests
Executed serial killers
Filipino serial killers
Male serial killers
People executed by Spain by hanging